This list consists of players who have played in Nippon Professional Baseball. Non-Japanese players who played in Japan are also included in this list.



A
Shinnosuke Abe
Benny Agbayani
Ryoji Aikawa
Norihiro Akahoshi
Koji Akiyama
Rod Allen
Matty Alou
George Altman
Yuya Ando
Norichika Aoki
Takahiro Arai
George Arias
Hideyuki Awano

B
Gene Bacque
John Bale
Eiji Bandō
Randy Bass
Tony Batista
Howard Battle
Kevin Beirne
Tony Bernazard
Frank Bolick
Takehiko Bessho
Kaoru Betto
Don Blasingame
Jack Bloomfield
Mike Blowers
Cedrick Bowers
Tony Brewer
John Britton
Terry Bross
Marty Brown
Roosevelt Brown
Ralph Bryant
Melvin Bunch
Ty Van Burkleo

C
Alex Cabrera
Robinson Checo
Phil Clark
Steve Cox
Warren Cromartie
Tommy Cruz

D
Yu Darvish
Glenn Davis
Orestes Destrade
Larry Doby
Shozo Doi
Yoshihiro Doi
Chris Donnels
J. D. Durbin

E
Angel Echevarria
Suguru Egawa
Takenori Emoto
Yutaka Enatsu

F
Pedro Feliciano
Cecil Fielder
Julio Franco
Matt Franco
Akihito Fujii
Masao Fujii
Kyuji Fujikawa
Atsushi Fujimoto
Hideo Fujimoto
Fumio Fujimura
Soichi Fujita
Kosuke Fukudome
Yutaka Fukumoto
Atsuya Furuta

G
Eddie Gaillard
Balvino Gálvez
Shosei Go
Leo Gómez
Koji Goto
Mike Greenwell
Kip Gross
Lindsay Gulin
Bill Gullickson
Domingo Guzmán

H
Kent Hadley
Tatsunori Hara
Isao Harimoto
Harris McGalliard
Shigetoshi Hasegawa
Masanori Hayashi
Osamu Higashio
Eric Hillman
Masaji Hiramatsu
Kazuyuki Hoashi
Kevin Hodges
Bob Horner
Dwayne Hosey
Nobuyuki Hoshino
Senichi Hoshino
Mike Holtz
Jack Howell

I
Hirokazu Ibata
Ryota Igarashi
Kei Igawa
Tadahito Iguchi
Takahiro Ikeyama
Toshiaki Imae
Makoto Imaoka
Kazuhisa Inao
Hideki Irabu
Yusaku Iriki
Hiromichi Ishige
Hirotoshi Ishii
Kazuhisa Ishii
Yutaka Ishii
Takuro Ishii
Tomohito Ito
Tsutomu Ito
Hisashi Iwakuma
Yoshiyuki Iwamoto
Akinori Iwamura
Hitoki Iwase

J
Darrin Jackson
Lou Jackson
Doug Jennings
Kenji Jojima
Davey Johnson

K
Hiromitsu Kadota
Masaru Kageura
Masayuki Kakefu
Genji Kaku
Masaichi Kaneda
Makoto Kaneko
Gabe Kapler
Takashi Kashiwada
Shinichi Kato
Takeharu Kato
Yoshitaka Katori
Masahiro Kawai
Tetsuharu Kawakami
Takeo Kawamura
Munenori Kawasaki
Matt Keough
Yusei Kikuchi
Ryuji Kimura
Takuya Kimura
Tatsuhiko Kinjoh
Mike Kinkade
Sachio Kinugasa
Willie Kirkland
Hiroshi Kisanuki
Manabu Kitabeppu
Ryohei Kiya
Kazuhiro Kiyohara
Atsushi Kizuka
Hiroyuki Kobayashi
Masahide Kobayashi
Masahito Kohiyama
Hideo Koike
Hiroki Kokubo
Norihiro Komada
Satoru Komiyama
Dae-Sung Koo
Makoto Kozuru
Yuya Kubo
Kimiyasu Kudoh
Tomoyuki Kubota
Hideki Kuriyama
Hiroki Kuroda
Satoshi Kuroda
Masumi Kuwata

L
Greg LaRocca
Chris Latham
Jim Lefebvre
Leon Lee
Leron Lee
Sang-Hoon Lee
Brad Lesley
Omar Linares
Luis Antonio Lopez
Luis Lopez
Jim Lyttle

M
Ken Macha
Tim Macintosh
Bill Madlock
Yukinaga Maeda
Takahiro Mahara
Charlie Manuel
Bobby Marcano
Jim Marshall
Domingo Martínez
Kazuo Matsui
Hideki Matsui
Takuya Matsumoto
Daisuke Matsuzaka
Darrell May
Derrick May
Scott McClain
Jim McManus
Dan Miceli
Osamu Mihara
Hensley Meulens
Félix Millán
Nate Minchey
Carlos Mirabal
Koichi Misawa
Bobby Mitchell
Daisuke Miura
Takashi Miwa
Shinya Miyamoto
Eiji Mizuguchi
Shigeru Mizuhara
Trey Moore
Shinji Mori
Masao Morinaka
Daisuke Motoki
Scott Mullen
Masanori Murakami
Arihito Muramatsu
Choji Murata
Shuichi Murata
Minoru Murayama

N
Yasuo Nagaike
Kazushige Nagashima
Shigeo Nagashima
Kiyoshi Nakahata
Haruyasu Nakajima
Micheal Nakamura
Norihiro Nakamura
Sho Nakata
Yoshihisa Naruse
Troy Neel
Jimmy Newberry
Don Newcombe
Tomohiro Nioka
Toshihisa Nishi
Fumiya Nishiguchi
Tsuyoshi Nishioka
Takashi Nishimoto
Kazutaka Nishiyama
Yukihiro Nishizaki
Michio Nishizawa
Hideo Nomo
Katsuya Nomura

O
Sherman Obando
Hiromitsu Ochiai
Alex Ochoa
Michihiro Ogasawara
Koichi Ogata
Sadaharu Oh
Akira Ohgi
Tomokazu Ohka
Hideki Okajima
Tom O'Malley
Naoyuki Ohmura
Steve Ontiveros
José Ortiz
Koichi Oshima
Akinori Otsuka

P
Jim Paciorek
Larry Parrish
Rodney Pedraza
Roberto Petagine
Jason Phillips
Carlos Ponce
Alonzo Powell
Jeremy Powell

R
Larry Raines
Alex Ramirez
Dave Rajsich
Gary Rajsich
Mathew Randel
Kenny Rayborn
Mike Reinbach
Tuffy Rhodes
Dave Roberts
Robert Rose

S
Takahiro Saeki
Kazumi Saito
Masaki Saito
Takashi Saito
Kazuhiro Sasaki
Shinichi Sato
Tomoya Satozaki
Eiji Sawamura
Erik Schullstrom
Fernando Seguignol
Andy Sheets
Naoyuki Shimizu
Takayuki Shimizu
Tsuyoshi Shinjo
Brian Sikorski
John Sipin
Reggie Smith
Tony Solaita
Alfonso Soriano
Daryl Spencer
Joe Stanka
Victor Starffin
Shigeru Sugishita
Toshiya Sugiuchi
Tadashi Sugiura
Kento Sugiyama
Ichiro Suzuki
Keishi Suzuki
Mac Suzuki
Takanori Suzuki

T
Koichi Tabuchi
Kazuhito Tadano
So Taguchi
Morimichi Takagi
Yutaka Takagi
Hisanori Takahashi
Yoshinobu Takahashi
Yosuke Takasu
Shingo Takatsu
Hitoshi Tamura
Kazunori Tanaka
Masahiro Tanaka
Yukio Tanaka
Hitoshi Taneda
Yoshitomo Tani
Motonobu Tanishige
Nick Testa
Gary Thomasson
Denney Tomori
Kiyoshi Toyoda
Yasumitsu Toyoda

U
Seiichi Uchikawa
Shinji Udaka
Koji Uehara
Masaru Uno
Shigeki Ushida

W
Kazuhiro Wada
Tsuyoshi Wada
Yutaka Wada
Tadashi Wakabayashi
Tsutomu Wakamatsu
Kenichi Wakatabe
Pete Walker
John Wasdin
Greg Wells
Roy White
Bernie Williams
Jeff Williams
Bump Wills
Nigel Wilson
Matt Winters
Tyrone Woods
Clyde Wright

Y
Yasuhiko Yabuta
Hisashi Yamada
Koji Yamamoto (Chiba Lotte Marines)
Koji Yamamoto (Hiroshima Toyo Carp)
Daisuke Yamashita
Wally Kaname Yonamine
Tetsuya Yoneda
Toyohiko Yoshida
Yoshio Yoshida
Masato Yoshii
Yuji Yoshioka

Z
Julio Zuleta

See also
List of Japanese people
List of Japanese players in Major League Baseball

Baseball players